The men's 50 metre freestyle at the 2009 IPC Swimming European Championships was held at Laugardalslaug in Reykjavik from 18–24 October.

Medalists

See also
List of IPC world records in swimming

References

freestyle 50 m men